Usul may refer to:

Ideas
Usul al-fiqh, a principle of Islamic jurisprudence
Usul al-Din, the Shi'a Roots of Religion
Usul (music), a rhythmic pattern used in Ottoman classical music.

Characters
Usul, the secret tribal name of Paul Atreides in Frank Herbert's Dune novels
a species in Neopets